Provincial roads in Izmir are maintained by the KGM. These roads serve as secondary roads to the State Roads and mainly connect small villages or acting as alternate routes to the trunk roads.

Provincial Road 35-04

Provincial Road 35-04, named Bergama Road, is a two-lane route that runs from the provincial border with Balıkesir, near Demircidere, to Bergama. The route becomes the P 10-57 once it crosses the border into Balıkesir, where it connects to the D.550 at its northern end. The southern end of the road is at an intersection with Adnan Menderes Boulevard (D.240) in east Bergama.

Provincial Road 35-05

Provincial Road 35-05 is a two-lane route that runs northeast, from an intersection with Adnan Menderes Boulevard (D.240), to the provincial border with Manisa. The route is named Turanlı Road for the first  section from Bergama to the intersection with P 35-06. From there, the route is named Bergama-İvrindi Road until it reaches İvrindi, in Balıkesir. At the provincial border with Manisa, the route becomes the P 45-76 for a short  span where it crosses into Balıkesir and becomes the P 10-55.

Provincial Road 35-06

On the official KGM map, the village is named Turanlı and the road is named Turanlı Road.

Provincial road 35-07

The route begins at the intersection with the P 35-05 and continues east through the villages of Ayaskent, Göçbeyli and Bölcek until its southeastern end at the intersection with the D.240 near Hamzahocalı.

Provincial road 35-25

The route serves the town of Kemalpaşa as well as several other villages on the south Kemalpaşa plain as well being an alternate route to the D.300 to Turgutlu. From the interchange with the D-300 to Kemalpaşa, the route is named Ulucak Kemalpaşa Street, within the town of Kemalpaşa the route is named Izmir Street. After Kemalpaşa the route is named Turgutlu Street.

Main Intersections

Provincial Road 35-26

Provincial Road 35-27

Provincial Road 35-28

Provincial Road 35-30

Provincial Road 35-31

Provincial Road 35-32

Provincial Road 35-33

Provincial Road 35-34

Provincial Road 35-35

Provincial Road 35-36

Provincial Road 35-37

Provincial Road 35-38

Provincial road 35-39

Provincial Road 35-40

Provincial Road 35-41

Provincial Road 35-51

Provincial Road 35-54

Provincial Road 35-62

Provincial Road 35-63
Bahribaba Park-Homeros Boulevard, Homeros Boulevard-Altındağ-İzmir Bus Station-O-5 (parts past Homeros Boulevard is under construction)

Provincial Road 35-79

Provincial Road 35-80

Provincial Road 35-81

Provincial road 35-82

Provincial Road 35-83

References

Provincial roads in Turkey